Miltonduff  is a hamlet 1.5 miles southwest of Elgin and is in the Scottish council area of Moray.

History
The village contains a 17th or 18th century rectangular dovecote. The dovecote is Category C listed and was restored in 1970.

The village contains a First and Second World war memorial for the local area. The memorial is in the form of a stone obelisk and is located beside the village hall.

Economy

Miltonduff Distillery is a Scotch whisky distillery in the village. Built in 1824, it is currently owned by Pernod Richard.

Education
Mosstowie Primary School is located in Miltonduff and provides primary education for children in the Miltonduff, Pluscarden and Mosstowie areas.

References

Villages in Moray
Hamlets in Scotland